Dame Gwyneth Jones  (born 7 November 1936) is a Welsh dramatic soprano, widely regarded as one of the greatest Wagnerian sopranos in the second half of the 20th century.

Early life and career

Jones was born in Pontnewynydd, Monmouthshire, Wales. Before becoming a professional singer, she worked as a secretary at the Pontypool foundry. She studied music at the Royal College of Music, London, the Accademia Musicale Chigiana (Siena) as well as the International Opera Studio (Zürich). 

After making her professional debut in 1962 as a mezzo-soprano in Gluck's opera Orfeo ed Euridice, she was engaged by the Zurich Opera House. She discovered that her easy top range could enable her to sing soprano roles and she switched to the soprano repertoire from around 1964, her first major soprano role being Amelia in Verdi's Un ballo in maschera.

Jones came to prominence in 1964 when she stood in for Leontyne Price as Leonora in Verdi's Il trovatore at the Royal Opera House, Covent Garden. Her career then developed rapidly, and she met with success as Aïda, Leonore (in Fidelio), Desdemona (in Otello), Elisabeth (in Don Carlos), Donna Anna (in Don Giovanni), Cio-cio-san (in Madama Butterfly), Lady Macbeth (in Verdi's Macbeth), Santuzza (in Cavalleria rusticana), Octavian (in Der Rosenkavalier), Médée (in the Italian version) and Tosca. 

From these, she gradually proceeded to heavier roles such as Chrysothemis (in Elektra), Salome, the Marschallin (in Der Rosenkavalier), Eva (in Die Meistersinger von Nürnberg), Senta (in Der fliegende Holländer), Kundry (in Parsifal), both Venus and Elisabeth (in Tannhäuser), Helena (in Strauss's Die ägyptische Helena), Ariadne (in Ariadne auf Naxos) and Sieglinde, as well as Brünnhilde (in Die Walküre).  She has appeared frequently at the Vienna State Opera, the Zurich Opera, the Royal Opera House, Covent Garden, the Bayerische Staatsoper, the San Francisco Opera, the Deutsche Oper Berlin, the Paris Opéra, the Teatro alla Scala, the Los Angeles Opera, the Metropolitan Opera, the Gran Teatre del Liceu, the Grand Théâtre de Genève, the Lyric Opera of Chicago, as well as many prominent opera and music festivals.

She made her debut at Teatro alla Scala as Leonora in Il Trovatore on 4 April 1967. She returned to La Scala as the title role of Salome in January 1974. On 24 November 1972, she made her debut at the Metropolitan Opera House of New York as Sieglinde in Die Walküre. Until her last appearance at the Met on 22 April 1995 (as Kundry in Parsifal), she sang 11 parts in 10 operas for 93 times at the Met; the most frequent part was the Marschallin in Der Rosenkavalier (20 times). In August 1979, she made her debut at Salzburg Summer Festival as the Marschallin.

Later career

Jones's large-scaled, powerful dramatic soprano voice, unusually robust vocal stamina, stage presence and acting abilities were widely admired.

One of her most noted achievements was her interpretation of Brünnhilde in the Bayreuth Jahrhundertring (Centenary Ring) in 1976, celebrating the centenary of both the festival and the first performance of the complete cycle, conducted by Pierre Boulez and staged by Patrice Chéreau. It was recorded and filmed in 1979 and 1980 for both video and audio discs. The recording won a Grammy in 1983.

Her career at Bayreuth Festival is as below:
1966: Sieglinde in Die Walküre
1968: Eva in Die Meistersinger von Nürnberg
1969: Senta in Der fliegende Holländer, Kundry in Parsifal
1970: Sieglinde in Die Walküre, Senta in Der fliegende Holländer, Kundry in Parsifal
1971: Sieglinde in Die Walküre, Senta in Der fliegende Holländer
1972: Elisabeth and Venus in Tannhäuser, Sieglinde in Die Walküre
1973: Elisabeth and Venus in Tannhäuser, Sieglinde in Die Walküre
1974: Elisabeth and Venus in Tannhäuser, Brünnhilde in Götterdämmerung
1975: Brünnhilde in Der Ring des Nibelungen cycle
1976: Brünnhilde in Der Ring des Nibelungen cycle (Jahrhundertring )
1977: Brünnhilde in Der Ring des Nibelungen cycle, Elisabeth and Venus in Tannhäuser
1978: Brünnhilde in Der Ring des Nibelungen cycle
1979: Brünnhilde in Der Ring des Nibelungen cycle
1980: Brünnhilde in Der Ring des Nibelungen cycle
1982: Senta in Der fliegende Holländer

Later in her career (from 1980 onwards), she undertook the title role of Elektra, Isolde (in Tristan und Isolde), the Dyer's Wife (in Die Frau ohne Schatten), Turandot, and Minnie (in La fanciulla del West). While best known for her work in the Wagner-Strauss-Puccini repertoire, her versatility enabled her to take on other roles, such as Poppea (in L'incoronazione di Poppea), Hanna Glawari (in The Merry Widow) and Norma. Starting from the 1990s, other than the aforementioned parts, she went on to sing Widow Begbick (Mahagonny), Ortrud (in Lohengrin), the Woman in Arnold Schoenberg's Erwartung, the Kostelnicka (in Jenůfa), the Kabanicha (in Káťa Kabanová), the Woman in Poulenc's La voix humaine, Ruth (in The Pirates of Penzance), Gertrud (in Hänsel und Gretel), Herodias (in Salome) and Klytämnestra (in Elektra). She appeared as the Dyers Wife in Die Frau ohne Schatten at the Cologne Opera in 1980 in a production by Jean Pierre Ponnelle, conducted by John Pritchard, with Walter Berry as the Dyer, Róbert Ilosfalvy as the Emperor, Siv Wennberg as the Empress, and Helga Dernesch as the Amme.

Jones made roles that exemplify the Wagnerian or heavy dramatic soprano fach, such as Brünnhilde, Isolde, Elektra, the Dyer's Wife and Turandot, part of her core repertoire, and performed them throughout the 1980s and 1990s. She once famously undertook the roles of both Elisabeth and Venus in Götz Friedrich's production of Tannhäuser at the Bayreuth Festival in the 1970s, and has also been credited with the rare achievement of having performed all three major female roles in Elektra on stage.

She also performed in concerts and lieder recitals, television and radio broadcasts and participated in several film projects, including the epic television series, Wagner, in which she played the first Isolde, Malvina Schnorr von Carolsfeld.  She has also devised for herself a couple of music-theatrical shows – Oh Malvina! and Die Frau im Schatten – which are inspired by real historical characters, namely, Malvina Schnorr von Carolsfeld and Pauline de Ahna (wife of Richard Strauss). The soprano part in the Symphony No. 9, titled "Vision of Eternity", of Welsh composer Alun Hoddinott was written for, and premiered by, her.

Later activities

In 2003, Jones made her debut as director and costume designer in a stage production of Der fliegende Holländer in Weimar, Germany. She has also given master-classes for young singers at notable venues and colleges of music, and acted as an adjudicator in international vocal competitions, including the 2009 BBC Cardiff Singer of the World competition and, more recently, the 2017 season of the reality operatic singing competition on the Russia-Kultura TV Channel, "The Big Opera" (the whole series of competition now being available for viewing on YouTube). 

In June 2007, she created the role of the Queen of Hearts in the world premiere of Unsuk Chin's new opera, Alice in Wonderland, at the Bavarian State Opera. In February 2008 she sang the part of Herodias in Stephen Langridge's production of Richard Strauss' Salome at Malmö Opera in Sweden. She repeated this role in August 2010, alongside the Salome of Deborah Voigt, in a concert performance at the Verbier Festival in Verbier, Switzerland, and performed the part on stage at the Vienna State Opera in May 2012. She took part in a piece of musical theatre about the women of the Wagner clan and their influences on the Bayreuth Festival entitled Wagnerin. Ein Haus der Kunstmusik, directed by Sven Holm at the 2012 Munich Opera Festival, playing Cosima Wagner. 

In March 2016, she made her debut as the Countess in Tchaikovsky's The Queen of Spades in a new production of the opera at the Staatstheater Braunschweig, Germany. In April 2017, she took on the part of the Narrator in Richard Strauss' Enoch Arden in a concert in Landsberg.

Jones makes a guest appearance in Quartet, a film by Dustin Hoffman, based on the comedy by Ronald Harwood about several retired opera singers planning to put on a concert to celebrate Verdi's birthday. She takes on the role of Anne Langley, a former operatic rival to Jean Horton, played by Dame Maggie Smith. The film was premiered to largely favourable reviews on 9 September at the 2012 Toronto International Film Festival, and Jones's performance was critically acclaimed.

She was made Commander of the Order of the British Empire (CBE) in 1976 and was promoted to Dame Commander of the Order of the British Empire (DBE) in 1986. She is also the recipient of numerous musical/cultural awards and honours from many different countries and organisations, including the Verdienstkreuz 1. Klasse of the Federal Republic of Germany, the Golden Medal of Honour in Vienna, the Austrian Cross of Honour First Class, the Shakespeare Prize and the Puccini Award.

She is a Kammersängerin at both the Vienna State Opera and the Bavarian State Opera (and also an Honorary Member of the former), and she has been made a Commandeur de L'Ordre des Arts et des Lettres in France. She has been conferred honorary doctorates by the University of Wales and the University of Glamorgan. She has been the President of the Wagner Society of Great Britain since 1990.

Recordings
Gwyneth Jones:  Operatic Recital (Classic Recitals series).  Arias from Fidelio, Médée, Der fliegende Holländer, Il trovatore and La forza del destino, plus Beethoven's concert aria Ah! Perfido, op. 65.  Vienna Opera Orchestra, conductor Argeo Quadri (Decca/Philips 475 6412 6 DM), originally Decca 1967
Gwyneth Jones: Scenes from Verdi:  Arias from Aïda, Don Carlo, Macbeth, Otello.  Orchestra of the Royal Opera House, Covent Garden/Edward Downes.  Decca 1969.
Gwyneth Jones sings Strauss Lieder: Includes Zueignung, Die Nacht, Allerseelen, Cäcilie, etc. Geoffrey Parsons, pno.  Capriccio 1989.
Gwyneth Jones sings Strauss: Vier letzte Lieder, etc.  Tokyo Symphony Orchestra/Roberto Paternostro.  KOCH Schwann 1991.
Gwyneth Jones sings Wagner:  Scenes from Tannhäuser, Lohengrin, Tristan und Isolde, Götterdämmerung. Kölner Rundfunk-Sinfonie-Orchester/Roberto Paternostro.  Chandos 1991.
Beethoven, Symphony No. 9: Wiener Philharmoniker/Karl Böhm.  Deutsche Grammophon
Beethoven, Symphony No. 9: Konzertvereinigung Wiener Staatsoper, Wiener Philharmoniker/Leonard Bernstein.  Deutsche Grammophon
Mahler, Symphony No. 8: London Symphony Orchestra/Leonard Bernstein.   Sony Classical
Sibelius, Tone Poems and Songs: London Symphony Orchestra, Scottish National Orchestra, Wiener Philharmoniker, BBC Symphony Orchestra/Antal Doráti, Alexander Gibson, Sir Malcolm Sargent.  EMI (this included the world premiere recording of Sibelius's Luonnotar,  sung by Jones)
Mendelssohn, Elijah: New Philharmonia Orchestra/Frühbeck de Burgos.  EMI
Operafest – A Gala Concert at the Zurich Opera House: Zurich Opera House/Ferdinand Leitner, Ralf Weikert, Andre Presser.  Video Artists International (DVD)
Gwyneth Jones in Concert (live concert 23.8.88) VAI DVD.  VAI
10,000 Voices: The World Choir and others/Owain Arwel Hughes.  EMI
Le Donne di Puccini: Münchner Rundfunkorchester/Garcia Navarro.  Nightingale
L'Art du Chant: Les Sopranes:  DVD.  Le Coulisses de L'Opera
Wagner, Götterdämmerung (Act 3): Orchestra of the Royal Opera House/Georg Solti.  Testament
 
Complete opera recordings (commercially released):
 
Fidelio (Böhm/DG(DVD))
Fidelio (Böhm/DG(cd))
Leonore (1805) (Melles/Orfeo(cd))
Macbeth (Kuhn/Sine qua non(cd))
Aïda (Muti/Bella Voce(cd))
Otello (Barbirolli/EMI(cd))
Salome (Böhm/DG(cd))
Elektra (Tate/Claves(cd))
Der Rosenkavalier Kleiber/DG(DVD))
Der Rosenkavalier (Bernstein/Sony(cd))
Die ägyptische Helena (Doráti/Decca(cd))
Die ägyptische Helena (Krips/RCA Victor(cd))
Der fliegende Holländer (Böhm/DG(cd))
Lohengrin (Kubelík/DG(cd))
Tannhäuser (Davis/DG(DVD))
Tristan und Isolde (Kout/ArtHaus(DVD))
Der Ring des Nibelungen (Boulez/DG(DVD), Philips(cd))
Götterdämmerung  (Solti/Decca(cd))
Parsifal (Boulez/DG(cd))
Notre Dame (Perick/Capriccio(cd))
Hänsel und Gretel (Davis/Philips(cd))
La fanciulla del West (Viotti/Sine qua non(cd))
Aufstieg und Fall der Stadt Mahagonny (Russell Davies/ArtHaus(DVD))
Médée (Gardelli/Decca(cd))
Alice in Wonderland (Nagano/Medici Arts(DVD))
Die Meistersinger von Nürnberg (Böhm/Orfeo(cd))
Il Trovatore  (Giulini/Royal Opera House Heritage Series(cd))

References

Further reading
 Liese, Kirsten, Wagnerian Heroines. A Century Of Great Isoldes and Brünnhildes, English translation: Charles Scribner, Edition Karo, Berlin, 2013.

External links

Gwyneth Jones biography from BBC Wales
Official website of the Wagner Society of Great Britain
Fan page at Parterre Box
Interview with Gwyneth Jones, 15 June 1985
Brunhilde (YouTube)
Recordings of rehearsals with Gwyneth Jones in the online-archive of the Österreichische Mediathek 

1936 births
Living people
Accademia Musicale Chigiana alumni
Alumni of the Royal College of Music
Dames Commander of the Order of the British Empire
Singers awarded knighthoods
Grammy Award winners
Honorary Members of the Royal Academy of Music
People from Pontypool
Welsh operatic sopranos
Officers Crosses of the Order of Merit of the Federal Republic of Germany
Österreichischer Kammersänger
20th-century Welsh women opera singers